Ken Grimes (born 1947) is an American artist from New York City. He was raised in Cheshire, Connecticut and creates his art at Fellowship Place in New Haven, Connecticut. Grimes is widely considered to be an outsider artist.

Grimes' artwork consists of monochrome drawings and paintings, typically consisting of white text and diagrams on a black background. His art deals with themes of coincidences, outer space, extraterrestrial life, and UFOs. Grimes received a Wynn Newhouse Award for his work in 2013.

Mental illness
Grimes was diagnosed with paranoid schizophrenia while in his twenties, leading to his withdrawal from college. He was hospitalized five times between 1971 and 1978.

References

External links
 Self-Taught Artists of the 20th Century: An American Anthology, 

1947 births
Living people
Outsider artists
American male painters
20th-century American painters
20th-century American male artists
21st-century American painters
21st-century American male artists
People from Cheshire, Connecticut
Painters from New York City
Painters from Connecticut
People with schizophrenia